Billy Leon McCrary (December 7, 1946 – July 14, 1979) and Benny Loyd McCrary (December 7, 1946 – March 26, 2001), known together as The McGuire Twins, were American professional wrestlers listed in the Guinness Book of World Records as the "World's Heaviest Twins" ( and , respectively).

Biographies
The twins were born in Hendersonville, North Carolina. They contracted rubella (German measles) when they were 4 years old, which caused problems for their pituitary glands and they started gaining weight. Their parents bought a farm to increase their physical activity and they ate only 1,000 calories per day but could not stop gaining weight. They each weighed 200 pounds by age 10 and 600 pounds by age 16. They dropped out of high school and moved to Texas, where they had jobs livestock branding.

They spent three years working at the Circus Circus Las Vegas, then performed their minbike routine for a few months in Los Angeles. A wrestling promoter saw them in El Paso, Texas and convinced them to begin a wrestling training program in Ciudad Juárez, Mexico, lifting weights and running often. In July 1972, at age 26, they made their in-ring debuts in Montreal, defeating John Anson and Kurt Von Hess.

From 1974 to 1978, they participated in several matches in Japan, organized by New Japan Pro-Wrestling, defeating other notable wrestling tag teams including Kantaro Hoshino and Seiji Sakaguchi as well as Osamu Kido and Riki Choshu. They used the stage name McGuire, which is the French version of their last name, since it was easier for Japanese ring announcers to pronounce.

The twins often used a finishing move called the "Tupelo Splash", which involved one of the twins diving belly-first onto a prone opponent; they would follow this with "The Steamroller", where the twin would roll back and forward over the opponent.

Billy McCrary died on July 14, 1979, at the age of 32, following a motorcycle accident in Niagara Falls en route to a Ripley's Believe It or Not! museum.

After the death of Billy, Benny tried to continue wrestling, partnering with Andre the Giant, but was not successful without his brother. Benny then opened a pawn shop and worked as an auctioneer in Hendersonville. He later moved to Walkertown, North Carolina and worked for the Christian Golfers Ministry. The cartilage in his knee wore out and he was eventually bedridden.

Benny died at age 54 on March 26, 2001 of heart failure. The brothers are buried side by side in a graveyard near Hendersonville. Their gravestone displays images of two Honda motorcycles and is inscribed "World’s Largest Twins".

Personal lives
The twins were married to sisters Maryse and Danielle Juarry, whom they met in Montreal. Benny believed in evangelicalism and enjoyed golf, playing until he was bedridden.

See also
 List of the heaviest people
 List of premature professional wrestling deaths
 Obesity

References

External links
 
  
 
 

1946 births
1979 deaths
2001 deaths
American male professional wrestlers
American twins
Independent promotions teams and stables
New Japan Pro-Wrestling teams and stables
People from Hendersonville, North Carolina
Professional wrestlers from North Carolina
Stampede Wrestling alumni
World record holders